Inge de Bruijn (born 24 August 1973) is a Dutch former competitive swimmer. She is a four-time Olympic champion and a former world record-holder.

Personal
De Bruijn was born in Barendrecht, Netherlands. Inge is the sister of Olympic water polo player Matthijs de Bruijn.

Swimming career
De Bruijn tried several sports before eventually specializing in swimming. De Bruijn debuted at the World Aquatics Championships in January 1991, winning a bronze medal with the 4×100 m relay team, with which she won the gold medal at the European LC Championships in August of that year.

The following year, de Bruijn made her Olympic debut at the 1992 Summer Olympics, and finished 8th in the 100 m and 4×100 m freestyle events. She did not compete at the 1996 Summer Olympics. In 1999, she won the 50 m freestyle at the European Championships. The following year, after having swum several 50 m freestyle world records, she competed in the 2000 Summer Olympics in Sydney, Australia. She won the 50 and 100 m freestyle, and the 100 m butterfly, setting world records in all three events. She also won a silver medal with the 4×100 m freestyle relay team. Her nickname became "Invincible Inky".

She was named by Swimming World as the "Female World Swimmer of the Year" in both 2000 and 2001. She won titles in three events at the 2001 World Championships. At the 2003 World Championships, de Bruijn successfully defended her 50 m freestyle and butterfly titles. At the 2004 Summer Olympics in Athens she defended her gold medal in the 50 m free, and took silver in the 100 m free, and two bronze: one in the 100 m butterfly and another in the 4×100 m relay. This made her the oldest individual champion in Olympic swimming history. This record was only surpassed by Anthony Ervin at the age of 36, he won the gold medal for the men's 50m freestyle at the Rio 2016 Olympics. De Bruijn's 2004 title retains its place as the oldest female Olympic champion in swimming history.

With an Olympic medal total of four gold, two silver and two bronze, she is the fourth most successful Dutch Olympian of all time. Moreover, her combined nine individual titles won at the Olympics (four) and World Aquatics Championships (five) were a record for female swimmers until Katie Ledecky won her 10th at the 2016 Summer Olympics.

In March 2007, de Bruijn announced her retirement from competitive swimming.

International championships (50 m)

 de Bruijn swam only in the heats

Post-swimming career
De Bruijn resides in Eindhoven, Netherlands, and previously trained in Portland, Oregon.

She was the face for Dutch lingerie brand Sapph, along with kickboxer Remy Bonjasky, the face for the men's line of the brand.

She appeared in a special episode of the Dutch naked dating reality television programme Adam Zkt. Eva VIP.

See also
 List of members of the International Swimming Hall of Fame
 List of Dutch records in swimming
 List of multiple Olympic gold medalists at a single Games
 List of multiple Olympic gold medalists
 List of multiple Summer Olympic medalists
 List of top Olympic gold medalists in swimming
 List of individual gold medalists in swimming at the Olympics and World Aquatics Championships (women)
 World record progression 50 metres freestyle
 World record progression 100 metres freestyle

References

External links

 
 
 
 
 

1973 births
Olympic swimmers of the Netherlands
Swimmers at the 1992 Summer Olympics
Swimmers at the 2000 Summer Olympics
Swimmers at the 2004 Summer Olympics
Living people
Dutch female butterfly swimmers
Dutch female freestyle swimmers
Olympic gold medalists for the Netherlands
Olympic silver medalists for the Netherlands
Olympic bronze medalists for the Netherlands
World record setters in swimming
Sportspeople from Barendrecht
Olympic bronze medalists in swimming
World Aquatics Championships medalists in swimming
Medalists at the FINA World Swimming Championships (25 m)
European Aquatics Championships medalists in swimming
Medalists at the 2004 Summer Olympics
Medalists at the 2000 Summer Olympics
Olympic gold medalists in swimming
Olympic silver medalists in swimming